Mapaville is an unincorporated community in Jefferson County, Missouri, United States. It is located approximately halfway between Festus and Hillsboro, at the intersection of routes A and Z.

References

Unincorporated communities in Jefferson County, Missouri
Unincorporated communities in Missouri